Pangoa District is one of eight districts of the province Satipo in Peru.

References